Felicity Johnson (born 26 February 1987) is an English professional golfer who has played on the U.S.-based LPGA Tour and the Ladies European Tour.

Johnson started playing golf at five years old and left school at 16 to pursue an amateur career. This was successful and she was named The Daily Telegraph Lady Golfer of the Year in 2005 after winning the 2005 English Women's Amateur Championship, was a member of the 2005 winning Vagliano Trophy team, and won 2005 Spirit International as part of the England Team.

Johnson turned professional in 2006 in and finished third at the 2008 ANZ Ladies Masters, the 2008 Göteborg Masters and the 2009 SAS Ladies Masters before earning her maiden win at the 2009 Tenerife Ladies Open at Golf Costa Adeje. She shot 62 (−10) in the first round of 2008 Göteborg Masters at Lycke Golf Course, a Ladies European Tour record. She claimed her second win at the 2011 Lacoste Ladies Open de France, winning a playoff with Diana Luna, the second playoff loss at the tournament in a row for Luna who was beaten in identical circumstances by Trish Johnson the previous year. More recently she was runner-up at the 2015 Lalla Meryem Cup and 2016 ISPS Handa New Zealand Open.

In 2018, the R&A-supported Golf Foundation named her an official Ambassador.

Amateur wins
2005 English Women's Amateur Championship

Professional wins (3)

Ladies European Tour wins (2)

ALPG Tour wins
2016 Mount Broughton Classic
2018 Seasons Aged Care Brisbane Invitational

Team appearances
Amateur
European Girls' Team Championship (representing England): 2003
Vagliano Trophy (representing Great Britain & Ireland): 2005 (winners)
Spirit International (representing England): 2005 (winners)
European Ladies' Team Championship (representing England): 2005
European Lady Junior's Team Championship (representing England): 2004, 2006

Professional
The Queens (representing Ladies European Tour): 2017

References

External links

English female golfers
Ladies European Tour golfers
LPGA Tour golfers
Sportspeople from Birmingham, West Midlands
1987 births
Living people